Antiblemma bistriga is a moth of the family Noctuidae first described by Heinrich Benno Möschler in 1886. It is endemic to Jamaica.

References

"Antiblemma bistriga". Moths of Jamaica. Retrieved January 25, 2020.

Catocalinae
Moths of the Caribbean